The Andaman scops owl (Otus balli) is an owl endemic to the Andaman Islands. The species is named after Valentine Ball.

Gallery

References

Andaman scops owl
Birds of the Andaman Islands
Andaman scops owl